The 1999 Hertsmere Borough Council election took place on 6 May 1999 to elect members of Hertsmere Borough Council in Hertfordshire, England. The whole council was up for election with boundary changes since the last election in 1998. The Conservative party gained overall control of the council from the Labour party.

Election result

References

1999 English local elections
1999
1990s in Hertfordshire